Lin Longchang (born 24 February 1990), is a Chinese footballer who currently plays as centre-back for Dalian Professional in the Chinese Super League.

Club career
Lin Longchang started his professional football career in 2007 when he joined Hangzhou Sanchao for the 2007 China League Two campaign. In March 2011, Lin transferred to China League One side Guizhou Zhicheng. While he would go on to establish himself as a regular within the team, the club would experience eccentric results with two relegations and two promotions until the 2016 season as Guizhou Zhicheng finished  runners-up of the league and gaining promotion to Chinese Super League. On 13 May 2017, he made his Super League debut in a 2–1 home win over Tianjin Quanjian, coming on as a substitute for Nikica Jelavić in the 94th minute.

The following season, Lin would unfortunately be part of the team that was relegated at the end of the 2018 Chinese Super League campaign. He would remain loyal towards the club and despite being an integral member of the team that came third within the league in the 2019 China League One campaign, it was not enough as the club narrowly missed out on promotion. At the end of the 2021 China League One campaign, the club was dissolved due to financial difficulties. On 21 April 2022, Lin would join top tier club Dalian Professional on a free transfer. He would go on to make his debut in a league game on 4 June 2022 against Henan Songshan Longmen F.C. in a 2-2 draw.

Career statistics 
Statistics accurate as of match played 31 December 2022.

Honours

Club
Guizhou Zhicheng
China League Two: 2012.

References

External links
 

1990 births
Living people
Chinese footballers
Footballers from Dalian
Association football defenders
Guizhou F.C. players
Chinese Super League players
China League One players
China League Two players